Ilex stenura is a species of small tree in the family Aquifoliaceae. It is endemic to New Guinea, growing in subalpine areas up to 2500 metres above sea level.

References

stenura